The White Goat Wilderness Area is a provincially designated wilderness area in the Canadian Rockies of Alberta. It was established in 1961 and it, as one of the three wilderness areas of Alberta, has the strictest form of government protection available in Canada. All development is forbidden and only travel by foot is permitted. Hunting and fishing are not allowed. The other two wilderness areas are Ghost River Wilderness Area and Siffleur Wilderness Area and together the three areas total .

White Goat is located near the west end and north side of Canadian Highway 11 and slightly north of the Siffleur Wilderness area. It is near the north end of Banff National Park, the south end of Jasper National Park, and east of the Columbia Icefield. The area has rugged mountains, glacier-carved valleys, mountain lakes, waterfalls, and alpine meadows. There are two distinct vegetation zones. Above , the tree line, are grasses, sedges and wildflowers. Below that are spruce, fir, and lodgepole pine. Animals in the lower regions include woodland caribou, moose, elk, white-tailed deer, mule deer, grizzly bear, black bear, cougar, coyote, timber wolf, and wolverine. Animals in the upper regions include golden-mantled ground squirrels, bighorn sheep, mountain goat, hoary marmot, pika, white-tailed ptarmigan, grey-crowned rosy finch, water pipit and horned lark. Eagles are seen in both the lower and upper regions.

References

External links
 Alberta Parks

Protected areas of Alberta
Parks in the Canadian Rockies
Protected areas established in 1961
1961 establishments in Alberta